Emily Harrison Hayden ( Spencer; 1869–1949) was a photographer who lived in and around Baltimore, Maryland.

Biography

Early life
Emily Harrison Spencer was born near Randallstown, Baltimore County, Maryland at her family's farm, "The Martin's Nest", to Edward Spencer (1834–1883) and A. C. Bradford "Braddie" Harrison Spencer (1841–1882). Edward Spencer was a writer and dramatist who wrote at times for the Baltimore Bulletin and The Baltimore Sun, and whose best known play was Kit, the Arkansas Traveler. He also collaborated with J. Thomas Scharf on his historical works on Baltimore City. Braddie Spencer was born in Talbot County, Maryland, and the couple married in 1861. The Spencer family had 4 children: Emily, Katharine, Robert, and Webster Lindsley. Sometime before 1880 they moved to Baltimore city so that Edward would be closer to his literary colleagues and for access to formal education for the children.

With the death of her parents in the early 1880s, care of the Spencer family was left to a woman named Eliza "Mammy" Benson. Benson, an African-American woman, a freed slave, had worked for Spencer family for many years before Emily's parents died, and would live with Emily Spencer Hayden after Emily married and had children. Mr. John McCoy, a friend of the Spencer family supported the children financially.

Early career and family
Emily Spencer graduated from Baltimore's Western High School as valedictorian. After graduation, she worked as a first grade teacher in the Baltimore Public Schools. In her spare time, she was a painter, reader, skater, and singer in the Ascension Episcopal Church choir. She met Charles S. Hayden, her future husband, possibly at the Shakespeare Club which both attended. After Charles's graduation from law school and acceptance to the bar, the two married on September 1, 1893. Their first child, Ruth, was born in 1895, followed by Catherine Spencer Hayden in 1902, and Anna Bradford Hayden in 1905. 

In 1906, the family moved to a home called "Nancy’s Fancy" in Catonsville near Mt. de Sales Academy. Emily became friends with her neighbor. writer Lizette Woodworth Reese, who often spent time with the family at "Nancy's Fancy". The thirteen room house was built in 1732 by the Davis family. The house was torn down in 1970 to build the Christian Temple Church.

Photography
When Emily began making photographs in the 1890s or early 1900s, she was already an accomplished artist who especially enjoyed making watercolors of Maryland scenes. "Nancy's Fancy," along with family and friends, were the focus of Emily’s photographic work for the next 40 years. Emily transformed an upstairs bathroom  of her home into a dark room, where she did all of her own developing and printing, working with a large format camera.

In the December 1921 issue of Photo-Era Magazine (Volume 47, Number 6, pp.291–93), she published an article, "My First Photograph", which discusses the first image she made of an infant. During the early twentieth century, she participated in numerous photographic competitions held by photography journals, as well as having many of her prints included in regional exhibitions.

Emily Spencer Hayden died in 1949, aged 79 or 80.

References

External links
The Emily Hayden Collection at the Maryland Historical Society

1869 births
1949 deaths
American women photographers
Date of birth unknown
Date of death unknown
Place of death unknown
People from Randallstown, Maryland
People from Catonsville, Maryland
Photographers from Maryland